Zechariah 9 is the ninth of the total 14 chapters in the Book of Zechariah in the Hebrew Bible or the Old Testament of the Christian Bible. This book contains the prophecies attributed to the prophet Zechariah, and is a part of the Book of the Twelve Minor Prophets. This chapter is a part of a section (so-called "Second Zechariah") consisting of Zechariah 9–14. It concerns about the advance of an enemy (cf. oracles in Amos and Ezekiel), but God defends Jerusalem and his king will triumphantly enter the city to bring peace among all nations. This chapter also contains a continuation of the subject in the seventh chapter. The part about the king's entry into Jerusalem (verses 9 and 10) is quoted in the New Testament, especially in the event of Jesus' triumphal entry into Jerusalem (Matthew 21, John 12).

Text 
The original text was written in the Hebrew language. This chapter is divided into 17 verses.

Textual witnesses
Some early manuscripts containing the text of this chapter in Hebrew are of the Masoretic Text, which includes the Codex Cairensis (from year 895), the Petersburg Codex of the Prophets (916), Aleppo Codex (930), and Codex Leningradensis (1008).

There is also a translation into Koine Greek known as the Septuagint, made in the last few centuries BCE. Extant ancient manuscripts of the Septuagint version include Codex Vaticanus (B; B; 4th century), Codex Sinaiticus (S; BHK: S; 4th century), Codex Alexandrinus (A; A; 5th century) and Codex Marchalianus (Q; Q; 6th century). Fragments containing parts of this chapter (a revision of the Septuagint) were found among the Dead Sea Scrolls, i.e., Naḥal Ḥever 8Ḥev1 (8ḤevXIIgr); late 1st century BCE) with extant verses 1–5

Foreign Nations Oracles (9:1-8)
This section contains some 'wisdom influence', such as the 'eye' motif (cf. ), which 'binds the book together', in verses 1 and 8, as well as many allusions to earlier prophets including Amos, Ezekiel, and Isaiah. There is a geographic movement from north to south as the word of the Lord moves from Syria or Aram (verse 1) to Jerusalem ("my house"; verse 8).

Verse 1
The burden of the word of the Lord in the land of Hadrach, 
and Damascus shall be the rest thereof: when the eyes of man, as of all the tribes of Israel, shall be toward the Lord.
And Hamath also shall border thereby; 
Tyrus, and Zidon, though it be very wise. And Tyrus did build herself a strong hold, and heaped up silver as the dust,and fine gold as the mire of the streets. Behold, the Lord will cast her out, and he will smite her power in the sea; and she shall be devoured with fire. 
"Hadrach": a city-state in northern region of Syria, stretching from south of Aleppo to north of Damascus.

King of peace (9:9–10)
This section serves as a 'linking passage', the first of several passages (10:1-2; 11:1-3; 11:17; and 13:7-9) which 'bind chapters 9–14 together' with some distinct characteristics: 'compact, metrical, uses opening imperatives and vocatives, and links the material that precedes and follows it'.

Verse 9

 Rejoice greatly, O daughter of Zion; shout, O daughter of Jerusalem: behold, thy King cometh unto thee: he is just, and having salvation; 
 lowly, and riding upon an ass,
  and upon a colt the foal of an ass.
"Ass" (KJV; NRSV: "donkey") and "colt": point to one animal in the 'style of Hebrew parallelism' (cf.), indicating 'peaceful intentions', in contrast to "horse" (or "war-horse") in verse 10.
New Testament authors see this verse as a prophecy to Jesus' triumphal entry into Jerusalem on Palm Sunday as quoted in).

Verse 10
 And I will cut off the chariot from Ephraim,
 and the horse from Jerusalem,
 and the battle bow shall be cut off:
 and he shall speak peace unto the heathen:
 and his dominion shall be from sea even to sea,
 and from the river even to the ends of the earth.
"The river": points to the Euphrates in northern Syria.

God will save his people (9:11–17)
This part pictures God as a warrior who brings 'ultimate victory to his oppressed people against the Greeks'.

Uses

Music
The King James Version of verses 9–10 from this chapter are cited as texts in the English-language oratorio "Messiah" by George Frideric Handel (HWV 56).

See also

Related Bible parts: Isaiah 62, Matthew 21, Mark 11, Luke 19, John 12

Notes

References

Sources

External links

Jewish
Zechariah 9 Hebrew with Parallel English
Zechariah 9 Hebrew with Rashi's Commentary

Christian
Zechariah 9 English Translation with Parallel Latin Vulgate 

09
Phoenicians in the Hebrew Bible